Beloostrov railway station is a railway station of the Riihimäki–Saint Petersburg railway in Beloostrov located at the border between St. Petersburg and Leningrad Oblast in Russia. The station is also a rail junction of the bypass route with a same direction to Finland Station through Sestroretsk.

History
The station was opened in 1869 and was built with a wooden station. The spurline to Sestroretsk was opened on 2 November 1871, requested by the Russian Ministry of Defence for communication of the Sestroretsk armory. The original station was destroyed during the Great Patriotic War and it was rebuilt in 1954 with the current structure. In 2015, the platforms were renovated to give a way for high-speed train service that runs between St. Petersburg and Helsinki named "Allegro".

Trains and destinations

References 

Railway stations in the Russian Empire opened in 1869
Railway stations in Saint Petersburg Railway Division